Thorswood is a nature reserve of the Staffordshire Wildlife Trust, situated in the Weaver Hills near the village of Stanton, in Staffordshire, England. It is a Site of Special Scientific Interest.

Description

There are hay meadows on low-lying ground, where ox-eye daisy, knapweed and betony may be found with the tall grasses. On the limestone grassland of the higher ground, there are low-growing flowering plants including salad burnet, cowslip and wild thyme.

Instead of intensive farming practices, there is light grazing and traditional farming techniques, some fields being mown to make hay; the grazing and mowing prevents the grass becoming overgrown and smothering the rarer plants.

History and prehistory
There are three Bronze Age bowl barrows within the reserve; they are scheduled monuments. The remains are a scheduled monument. Visitors to the reserve are advised to keep to the marked trails where indicated, in order to avoid mineshafts.

References

Nature reserves in Staffordshire
Forests and woodlands of Staffordshire
Parks and open spaces in Staffordshire
Sites of Special Scientific Interest in Staffordshire